Medina Dešić (born 15 September 1993) is a German-born Montenegrin footballer who plays as a forward for Würzburger Kickers and the Montenegro women's national team.

Early life
Dešić was raised in Erlenbach am Main.

International career
Dešić made her senior debut for Montenegro in mid-January 2020 in a friendly match against Bosnia and Herzegovina.

On 16 August 2021 she signed a new treaty, switching from the Würzburger Kickers to RB Leipzig, starting a professional career.

International goals

References

External links

Women's association football forwards
Montenegrin women's footballers
Montenegro women's international footballers
German women's footballers
Footballers from Bavaria
People from Erlenbach am Main
Sportspeople from Lower Franconia
German people of Montenegrin descent
2. Frauen-Bundesliga players
Würzburger Kickers players
1993 births
Living people